Sam Alastair Nicholson (born 20 January 1995) is a Scottish footballer who plays as a left winger or left midfielder for Colorado Rapids in Major League Soccer.

Career

Heart of Midlothian
Nicholson attended Penicuik High School in Midlothian and grew up supporting Heart of Midlothian. He joined Hearts aged 12, progressing through their youth teams until on 31 August 2013, he made his senior debut for the club, coming on as a 74th-minute substitute in a Scottish Premiership match against Inverness Caledonian Thistle, replacing Jamie Walker in a 2–0 defeat. His first senior goal for the side came on 18 January 2014, helping Hearts come from 3–1 down at McDiarmid Park scoring in the 89th minute to help Hearts earn a point in a 3–3 draw against St Johnstone.

On 16 June 2014, Nicholson signed a new three-year contract extending his stay until the summer of 2017, following the club's relegation to the Scottish Championship.

Nicholson began the 2014–15 season by setting up a goal for Osman Sow at Ibrox in stoppage time. He scored his first goal of the season against Hibs in the Edinburgh Derby; a solo effort after he nutmegged Scott Robertson and hit a left-footed drive beyond the keeper.

Minnesota United
On 28 June 2017, it was confirmed that Nicholson agreed to a contract with MLS side Minnesota United FC, and would be eligible to join the team on 10 July 2017.

Colorado Rapids
Nicholson was traded from Minnesota to Colorado Rapids on 1 May 2018. Colorado also received an International Roster slot. Minnesota received Eric Miller and $50,000 of General Allocation Money in return.

Bristol Rovers
On 22 July 2020, Nicholson returned to the UK, delighted to sign for League One club Bristol Rovers. He made his debut for the club on 5 September 2020, in a 3-0 League Cup defeat to Ipswich Town. Nicholson scored his first goal for the club on 31 October 2020, opening the scoring in a 1–1 draw at Rochdale, driving forward with the ball before firing in from the edge of the box. In late March 2021, Rovers' manager Joey Barton announced that Nicholson would miss the rest of the season as Rovers would fight against the drop, due to the fact that he was to have surgery on his hip, which it was announced in April 2021 he had still yet to have had the operation and would likely miss the start of the 2021–22 season also.

Nicholson opened his account for the 2021–22 season as he opened the scoring in a League Two 1–1 draw with Barrow, who had been reduced to ten men. The season ended in success for Nicholson and Rovers as a 7–0 victory on the final day of the season saw Rovers move into the final automatic promotion place on goals scored.

Return to Colorado
On 17 June 2022, it was announced that Nicholson had re-joined MLS side Colorado Rapids on a two-and-a-half year deal. Nicholson made his second debut for the club in a 2–2 comeback draw with Real Salt Lake.

Career statistics

Honours
Heart of Midlothian
Scottish Championship: 2014–15

Bristol Rovers
EFL League Two third-place promotion: 2021–22

References

External links
 
 
 

Living people
1995 births
Scottish footballers
Footballers from Edinburgh
People educated at Penicuik High School
Association football wingers
Heart of Midlothian F.C. players
Minnesota United FC players
Colorado Rapids players
Bristol Rovers F.C. players
Scottish Professional Football League players
Major League Soccer players
English Football League players
Scotland youth international footballers
Scotland under-21 international footballers
Scottish expatriate footballers
Expatriate soccer players in the United States
Scottish expatriate sportspeople in the United States
Sportspeople from Midlothian